Westbrook is a city in Mitchell County, Texas, United States. The population was 203 at the 2000 census.

History
The Westbrook Oil Field was discovered on 5 March 1921, when the Texas and Pacific Abrams No. 1 well was completed to a depth of 2498 feet.  L.W. Sandusky and P.C. Coleman convinced the Underwriters Producing and Refining Company to drill a test well, which was spudded on 8 February 1920.  A subsidiary of Standard Oil of California, the California Company, bought the Underwriters' property in December 1922.  By 1926, there were 77 producing wells, with total production amounting to 3400 barrels.  Production is from a dolomitic limestone within the Permian Basin.

Geography
Westbrook is located at  (32.357027, −101.012552).

Demographics

As of the census of 2000, 203 people, 79 households, and 54 families resided in the city. The population density was 504.3 people per square mile (195.9/km). The 103 housing units averaged 255.9/sq mi (99.4/km). The racial makeup of the city was 89.66% White, 0.49% Native American, 8.87% from other races, and 0.99% from two or more races. Hispanics or Latinos of any race were 25.62% of the population.

Of the 79 households, 34.2% had children under the age of 18 living with them, 50.6% were married couples living together, 11.4% had a female householder with no husband present, and 31.6% were not families; 30.4% of all households were made up of individuals, and 13.9% had someone living alone who was 65 years of age or older. The average household size was 2.57 and the average family size was 3.17.

In the city, the population was distributed as 30.0% under the age of 18, 5.4% from 18 to 24, 28.1% from 25 to 44, 21.7% from 45 to 64, and 14.8% who were 65 years of age or older. The median age was 36 years. For every 100 females, there were 89.7 males. For every 100 females age 18 and over, there were 91.9 males.

The median income for a household in the city was $27,143, and for a family was $38,281. Males had a median income of $23,750 versus $16,786 for females. The per capita income for the city was $13,500. About 13.1% of families and 18.4% of the population were below the poverty line, including 18.8% of those under the age of 18 and 14.3% of those 65 or over.

Education
The city of Westbrook is served by the Westbrook Independent School District and home to the Westbrook High School (Texas) Wildcats.

Notable people

 Ralph W. Ramsey, a Border Patrol inspector, was killed in the line of duty on February 26, 1942, in Columbus, New Mexico A forward operating base, "Camp Ramsey", west of Columbus, was named in his honor.

References

Cities in Mitchell County, Texas
Cities in Texas